Jonas Seifert-Salk (born 27 June 2000) is a motorcycle speedway rider from Denmark.

Speedway career 
Seifert-Salk has two silver medals at the Team Speedway Under-21 World Championship in 2018 and 2020. He won a bronze medal at the Danish Under 21 Individual Speedway Championship and three silver medals at the Team Speedway Junior European Championship in 2019, 2020 and 2022.

He represented Denmark in the 2021 and 2022 European Pairs Speedway Championship and as an unused substitute won the gold medal at the 2022 European Pairs Speedway Championship. 

In 2022, he was riding for Slangerup in Denmark, Poznań in Poland and Piraterna in Sweden. He helped PSŻ Poznań win the 2022 2.Liga.

References 

Living people
2000 births
Danish speedway riders